Meigs Creek may refer to:

Meigs Creek (Muskingum River), a stream in Ohio
Meigs Creek (Shade River), a stream in Ohio
Meigs Creek (California)
Meigs Creek (Tennessee)